Dīn (also anglicized as Deen) is an Arabic word with three general senses: judgment, custom, and religion. It is used by both Muslims and Arab Christians. 

In Islamic terminology, the word refers to the way of life Muslims must adopt to comply with divine law, encompassing beliefs, character and deeds. The term appears in the Quran 98 times with different connotations, including in the phrase yawm al-din, generally translated to "Day of Judgment" or the famous verse "La ikraha fid din" which translates to "Let there be no compulsion in religion." (Abdullah Yusuf Ali Translation).

Etymology

The Arabic dīn has Semitic cognates, including the Hebrew "dīn",  Aramaic dīnā, Amharic dañä (ዳኘ) and Ugaritic dyn (𐎄𐎊𐎐).

The Arabic sense of judgment is likely analogous to the Hebraeo-Aramaic cognate root. The Hebrew term "דין", transliterated as "dīn", means either "law" or "judgement". In the Kabbalah of Judaism, the term can, alongside "Gevurah" (cognate to the feminine form of Arabic adjective "Jabārah جَبَّارَة"), refer to "power" and "judgement". In ancient Israel, the term featured heavily in administrative and legal proceedings i.e. Bet Din, literally "the house of judgement," the ancient building block of the Jewish legal system. The Arabic sense "custom, usage" has been derived by classical and modern lexicologists from the Arabic verbal forms dāna (دانى, "be indebted") and dāna li- (-دانى لِ, "submit to"). Louis Gardet sees the Hebraic and Arabic senses as related through the notions of retribution, debt, obligation, custom, and direction, prompting him to translate yawm al-din as "the day when God gives a direction to each human being".

According to  Jeffery Arthur dīn "related to religion" and dīn "judgement, debt etc..." are two separate words of different origin, he derives the dīn related to religion from the Middle Persian den, itself derived from the Zoroastrian Avestan notion daena. Most scholars, such as Nöldeke, Vollers, Mushegh Asatrian and Johnny Cheung  are in agreement with this etymology. Others like Gaudefroy-Demombynes and Gardet, have found this derivation unconvincing. Nonetheless, Al Khafaji and Tha'ahbi have included the dīn that is related to religion in their list of foreign words, due to its lack of verbal root.

Use in Islam

It has been said that the word Dīn appears in as many as 79 verses in the Qur'an, but because there is no exact English translation of the term, its precise definition has been the subject of some misunderstanding and disagreement. For instance, the term is often translated in parts of the Qur'an as "religion".

Some Qur'anic scholars have translated Dīn in places as "faith" Others suggest that the term "has been used in various forms and meanings, e.g., system, power, supremacy, ascendancy, sovereignty or lordship, dominion, law, constitution, mastery, government, realm, decision, definite outcome, reward and punishment. On the other hand, this word is also used in the sense of obedience, submission and allegiance".

In addition to the two broad usages referred to so far, of sovereignty on the one hand and submission on the other, others have noted  that the term Dīn is also widely used in translations of the Qur'an in a third sense. Most famously in its opening chapter, al-Fātiḥah, the term is translated in almost all English translations as "judgment":

{{Cquote|1:3  

The well-known Islamic scholar, Fazlur Rahman Malik, suggested that Dīn is best considered as "the way-to-be-followed". In that interpretation, Dīn is the exact correlate of Shari'a: "whereas Shari'a is the ordaining of the Way and its proper subject is God, Dīn is the following of that Way, and its subject is man". Thus, "if we abstract from the Divine and the human points of reference, Shari'a and Dīn would be identical as far as the 'Way' and its content are concerned".

In many hadith, the din has been described as a midway lifestyle:

See also 
 Daena
 List of Islamic terms in Arabic
 Sharia
 Christian worldview
 Kabbalah
 Wasatiyyah (Islamic term)

References

External links
 Definition of Deen

Arabic words and phrases
Islamic terminology